Yves-Alexandre de Marbeuf (Rennes, 1734-Lübeck, 1799) was a French bishop of Autun and archbishop of Lyon, and statesman. He was an opponent of the European Enlightenment thinking, and of Jansenism.

He went into exile after the French Revolution.

Biography
Nephew of the Earl of Marbeuf, protector of Napoleon Bonaparte in his youth, he was appointed Bishop of Autun on April 19, 1767, the seat he held until 1788; his successor is the famous Charles Maurice de Talleyrand-Périgord.
He then accesses the lucrative archbishopric of Lyon (50 000 annual pension of pounds). He also received in 1782 the Abbey of Bec, he was the last abbot.

Under the Old Regime, he was Minister of sheet profit, which managed the allocation of ecclesiastical positions in France.

From the early revolutionary times Marbeuf arises as a conservative. He is not opposed to the aux États généraux, but stood strongly against the Constitution civile du clergé.

He decided to emigrate and was replaced in the see of Lyon by Bishop Antoine-Adrien Lamourette, juror, but in the eyes of the Catholic Church, Bishop Marbeuf was the legitimate bishop of Lyon until his death in 1799.

Notes

External links
Catholic Hierarchy page

1734 births
1799 deaths
Bishops of Autun
Archbishops of Lyon
18th-century Roman Catholic archbishops in France
18th century in Lyon